The list of Olympic men's ice hockey players for Germany consisted of 161 skaters and 20 goaltenders. Men's ice hockey tournaments have been staged at the Olympic Games since 1920 (it was introduced at the 1920 Summer Olympics, and was permanently added to the Winter Olympic Games in 1924). Germany has participated in six tournaments, the first in 1928 and the most recent in 2018. Between 1968 and 1988 Germany was divided at the Olympics, and both West Germany and East Germany sent separate teams. Germany's best finish is second overall, winning a silver medal at the 2018 Winter Olympics, while their lowest finish was eleventh place in 2010.

Markus Egen has scored the most goals, 14, and points, 16, while Thomas Brandl has the most assists with 6. Both Christian Ehrhoff and Stefan Ustorf Udo Kiessling have competed in the most Olympics, appearing in four tournaments with Germany, with Ustorf playing the most games, with 24.

Seven players, Rudi Ball, Dieter Hegen, Gustav Jaenecke, Udo Kiessling, Uwe Krupp, Hans Rampf, and Xaver Unsinn have been inducted into the International Ice Hockey Federation Hall of Fame, though Unsinn was inducted as a builder.



Key

Goaltenders

Skaters

References

Bibliography

 
 
 
 
 

ice hockey
Germany
Germany